Greg Lee (born March 3, 1962) is an American actor, voice actor, and comedian.

Biography
Lee was born in Hebron, Nebraska. He attended York College in York, Nebraska, and Oklahoma Christian University in Oklahoma City in the early 1980s. Lee co-hosted (with Molly Scott) Nickelodeon's variety show Total Panic from 1989 to 1990. From  1990 to 1991, he stayed on Nickelodeon to be an announcer for another show, Outta Here! He is best known for his roles as ACME's Special (later Senior) Agent in Charge of Training New Recruits on Where in the World Is Carmen Sandiego? and as the voice of Mayor/Principal White on Doug. Lee got his start acting in television commercials and bit parts in different films and TV shows. He worked as a contestant coordinator on Double Dare.  Lee currently is a player with Tokens, a variety show from Nashville, Tennessee, that performs at the Ryman Auditorium.  His character is Brother Preacher.
He was also hired for the pilot episode of the show NewsRadio. Ray Romano was originally hired for the part, but he was fired before filming began. Joe Rogan was hired to replace Romano and went on to star after the pilot.

Filmography

Discography
 Where in the World Is Carmen Sandiego? (1992)
 Carmen Sandiego: Out of This World (1994)

External links

References 

1962 births
People from Hebron, Nebraska
Male actors from Nebraska
American game show hosts
Living people
American male voice actors